Technische Nothilfe (abbreviated as TN, T.N, T.H, Tech Nh, TeNo, TENO) was a German organisation. It began as a strikebreaker organisation after the First World War, but developed into a volunteer emergency response unit. During the Nazi period TN became in charge of technical civil defence.

History
The TN was founded on September 30, 1919 by Otto Lummitzsch with the stated purpose to protect and maintain vital & strategic facilities (e.g. gas works, water works, power stations, railways, post offices, agriculture concerns and food production activities). At the time (1919–1923), these vital infrastructure facilities were under threat from sabotage and attack during a period bordering on civil war, which was caused by the collapse of German economy following the end of World War I and exacerbated by a spate of politically motivated wildcat strikes, usually by left-wing elements. In effect they were strike-breakers.

The organization was formed from primarily post World War I army engineering/technical unit members, and transitioned into a volunteer civilian organisation which was registered by the Department of the Interior. The change was required by the demilitarisation requirements of the Treaty of Versailles, in order that the TN would not be classified as a military organization. Based on the nature of its operations, the background of its personnel was mainly conservative middle class, but included a large number of students, especially those in technical studies. In the Weimar Republic period, the TN was seen as a threat by the working class and thus aroused the animosity of trade unionists, and more particularly the Communist Party of Germany. The TN intervened as a volunteer aide organization, when strikes could not be avoided, and when the public welfare was endangered as in strikes of electricity, food service and railroad workers.

As economic conditions improved (after about 1925) and strikes became less common and less aggressive, the TN was able to shift its activities into public welfare areas such as disaster relief (Katastrophendienst), with respect to floods, fires, industrial accidents, bridge and railway collapses; as well as responding to motor vehicle accidents in the countryside. A mobile Bereitschaftdienst (BD; literally ‘Call Service’) was set up, in order to be able to more readily respond. Clandestine air raid protection activities also began in the late 1920s – early 1930s as the Luftschutzdienst (LD; ‘Air Protection Service’). From 1931 to 1934, the TN also became involved in the Freiwilligen Arbeitsdienst (FAD; 'Volunteer Labour Service') and supervised training at over 12,000 locations. The FAD was later morphed into the Reichsarbeitsdienst (RAD).
Throughout the Third Reich the TN, within Germany, focused on civil defence — air raid rescue, general disaster response, and relief work. From 1936 the TN was gradually absorbed into Ordnungspolizei as an auxiliary police organization and it came under the ultimate control of Heinrich Himmler, as the head of the police, and ultimately the SS. From June 1, 1943, the TN members, serving outside of the Reich, wore the green uniform of the Police and were referred to as the TN-Police. In addition to working within Germany, the TN was active in Nazi-occupied countries from September 1, 1939 as Einsatzgruppen, which followed the Wehrmacht and restored vital services and functions in Poland, France, Belgium, Netherlands, Luxembourg, and Norway. Local TN branch organisations were formed in some occupied countries, notably as the Technische Noodhulp in the Netherlands and as the Teknisk Nødhjelp in Norway.

The TN Einsatzgruppen participated in the occupation of the Saar, Austria, Sudetenland, Poland and then in the Western Campaigns of 1940. Their purpose was to secure vital industries, prevent or repair sabotage, rebuild the infrastructure (bridges, power plants, drinking water facilities, wastewater facilities, etc.) TN units were taken into Luftwaffe (air force) service early on and other TN units into Heer (land army) service in mid 1941. Those in Army were named the Technische Truppen, which was commanded by Erich Hampe, the long term Stellv. Chef der TN [#2 TN man from 1919 to 1940]. Also, some TN units served in the Kriegsmarine (Navy), although it is poorly documented. Other TN units, under the control of the TN Headquarters (Reichsamt Technische Nothilfe), remained in service until the end of World War II.

In 1945 the victorious Allies dissolved the TN. Its functions were assumed again in 1950 when Otto Lummitzsch was requested by the West German government to form the Technisches Hilfswerk (literally: 'Technical Relief') which exists to the present day with civil defence responsibilities and also participates in worldwide disaster relief responses.

Leadership

Chief

Deputy Chief

Ranks

References

Further reading

Technische Nothilfe in der Weimar Republic - Dr. Andreas Linhardt
Defending the Reich - Bender / David Littlejohn
German Police, Vol. 2 - Bender / John Angolia and Hugh Page Taylor

1919 establishments in Germany
1945 disestablishments in Germany
Weimar Republic
Nazi Party organizations
Civil defense